This article contains information about the literary events and publications of 1754.

Events
 January 28 – Horace Walpole, in a letter to Horace Mann, coins the word serendipity (from the Persian fairy tale The Three Princes of Serendip).
 March 2 – Riot at Smock Alley Theatre in Dublin. Thomas Sheridan, the manager, resigns, and leaves Ireland on September 15 for London where his wife Frances Sheridan meets Samuel Richardson.
 Élie Catherine Fréron's journal Lettres sur quelques écrits de ce temps is replaced by his Année littéraire.

New books

Fiction
Jane Collier and Sarah Fielding – The Cry: A New Dramatic Fable
Mary Davys – The Reformed Coquet; or Memoirs of Amoranda
Henry Fielding – The Life of Mr. Jonathan Wild the Great (enlarged and expanded from the Miscellanies of 1743)
Solomon Gessner – Daphnis
Sarah Scott:
Agreeable Ugliness
A Journey Through Every Stage of Life
John Shebbeare – The Marriage Act

Poetry

Thomas Cooke – An Ode on Poetry, Painting, and Sculpture
John Duncombe – The Feminiad
Henry Jones – The Relief
William Whitehead – Poems

Non-fiction
Anonymous – Critical Remarks on Sir Charles Grandison, Clarissa and Pamela
Thomas Birch – Memoirs of the Reign of Queen Elizabeth
Charles Bonnet – Essai de psychologie
John Gilbert Cooper – Letters Concerning Taste
John Douglas – Letter on the Criterion of Miracles
John Gillies – Historical Collections Relating to Remarkable Period of the Success of the Gospel
Zachary Grey – Critical, Historical, and Explanatory Notes on Shakespeare
Benjamin Hoadly – Sixteen Sermons
David Hume – The History of England (volume 1)
William Law – The Second Part of the Spirit of Love
Isaac Newton (died 1727) – An Historical Account of Two Notable Corruptions of Scripture (written 1690)
Jean-Jacques Rousseau – Discourse on Inequality
Henry St. John – Philosophical Works
Jonathan Swift
Brotherly Love
The Works of Jonathan Swift (the Hawkesworth edition)
William Warburton – A View of Lord Bolingbroke's Philosophy
Thomas Warton – Observations on the Faerie Queene of Spenser

Drama
 Samuel Crisp – Virginia
David Garrick – Catharine and Petruchio (adapted from The Taming of the Shrew)
John Gay – The Rehearsal at Goatham
Macnamara Morgan:
Philoclea (from Sir Philip Sidney's Arcadia)
The Sheep-Shearing, or Florizel and Perdita (a farce adapted from The Winter's Tale)
Prosper Jolyot de Crébillon – Le Triumvirat
 William Whitehead – Creusa, Queen of Athens

Births
March 24 – Joel Barlow, American poet and diplomat (died 1812)
May 23 – William Drennan, Irish physician, poet, radical and educationalist (died 1820)
July 11 – Thomas Bowdler, English editor (died 1825)
August 2 – Lady Charlotte Murray, English writer and botanist (died 1808)
October 13 – Frances Jacson, English novelist (died 1842)
December 24 – George Crabbe, English poet (died 1832)
unknown date – Ioan Caragea, Greek Prince of Wallachia, translator and theatrical promoter (died 1844)

Deaths
January 11 – Wu Jingzi, Chinese scholar and novelist (born 1701)
January 28 – Ludvig Holberg, Norwegian philosopher, historian and playwright (born 1684)
April 2 – Thomas Carte, English historian (born 1686)
April 9 – Christian Wolff, German philosopher (born 1679)
October 8 – Henry Fielding English novelist (born 1707)
November 12 – Robert Morris, English architect and writer on architecture (born 1703)

References

 
Years of the 18th century in literature